Buchkirchen is a municipality in the district of Wels-Land in the Austrian state of Upper Austria.

Geography
Buchkirchen lies in the Hausruckviertel. About 10.9% of the municipality is forest, and 76.9% is farmland.

Parts of Buchkirchen
Those parts are called Ortschaften in German:

Buchkirchen, Elend, Ennsberg, Epping, Hörling, Haberfelden, Hartberg, Hochscharten, Holzwiesen, Hundsham, Hupfau, Kandlberg, Lachgraben, Luckermair, Mistelbach bei Wels, Niedergrafing, Niederhocherenz, Niederlaab, Obergrafing, Oberhocherenz, Oberperwend, Oberprisching, Ottenham, Radlach, Öhnerhäuser, Ötzing, Schickenhäuser, Schnadt, Sommerfeld, Spengenedt, Unterholz, Wörist, Wolfsgrub.

History
In 1179 Buchkirchen was mentioned in a document of Pope Alexander III. In those years Buchkirchen was named as "Puechkirchen".

Population

Sights
 The church Pfarrkirche Buchkirchen
 The church Filialkirche Mistelbach
 The castle Schloss Mistelbach (Schloss = German for Castle)The castle is now a school called Fachschule ÖKO Wirtschaft und design

References

Cities and towns in Wels-Land District